Mount Iowa, at  above sea level is a peak in the Sawtooth Range of Idaho. The peak is located in the Sawtooth Wilderness of Sawtooth National Recreation Area in Custer County.

See also

 List of peaks of the Sawtooth Range (Idaho)
 List of mountains of Idaho
 List of mountain peaks of Idaho
 List of mountain ranges in Idaho

References 

Iowa
Iowa
Sawtooth Wilderness